Issam Chebake (born 12 October 1989) is a Moroccan professional footballer who plays as a right-back for Cypriot First Division club APOEL and the Morocco national team.

International career
Chebake was born in Morocco, and raised in France. He debuted for the Morocco national team in a 2017 Africa Cup of Nations qualification 2–0 win over Cape Verde on 3 March 2016.

Career statistics

References

External links
 Issam Chebake at foot-national.com
 
 
 

1989 births
Living people
People from Agadir
Moroccan footballers
Morocco international footballers
Moroccan expatriate footballers
Moroccan expatriate sportspeople in Cyprus
Moroccan expatriate sportspeople in France
Moroccan expatriate sportspeople in Turkey
Expatriate footballers in Cyprus
Expatriate footballers in France
Expatriate footballers in Turkey
Association football defenders
US Sarre-Union players
Rodez AF players
Le Havre AC players
Yeni Malatyaspor footballers
Ligue 2 players
Süper Lig players